Krista Kilburn-Steveskey (born June 28, 1968) is the former coach of the Hofstra University women's basketball team. Before becoming the head coach at Hofstra, she was an assistant for the James Madison University women's basketball team for 4 season.

As a high school head coach at Wheeler High School in Marietta, Ga., She turned around a subpar Lady Wildcat program nearly immediately. In her second season at the helm, Kilburn-Steveskey paced Wheeler to GHSA Class AAAA Girls State Championship in 1998.

The head coach at Wheeler from 1996 to 2002, Kilburn-Steveskey posted a 143–38 record. She was honored as the Georgia Class AAAA Coach of the Year in 1998.

Coach Kilburn-Steveskey played college basketball under Hall of Fame coach, Kay Yow, at North Carolina State from 1986 to 1990.

Head Coaching Record

Personal
Kilburn-Steveskey is a native of Fayetteville, Georgia.

References 

Living people
1968 births
High school basketball coaches in the United States
Hofstra Pride women's basketball coaches
James Madison Dukes women's basketball coaches
NC State Wolfpack women's basketball players
American women's basketball coaches